NGC 3840 is a spiral galaxy located about 320 million light-years away in the constellation Leo. The galaxy was discovered by astronomer Heinrich d'Arrest on May 8, 1864. NGC 3840 is a member of the Leo Cluster. The galaxy is rich in neutral atomic hydrogen (H I) and is not interacting with its environment.

NGC 3840 is likely to be a low-luminosity AGN (LLAGN).

See also
 List of NGC objects (3001–4000)

References

External links
 

3840
36477
6702
Leo (constellation)
Leo Cluster
Spiral galaxies
Astronomical objects discovered in 1864
Active galaxies